Copelatus neoguineensis is a species of diving beetle. It is part of the genus Copelatus in the subfamily Copelatinae of the family Dytiscidae. It was described by Zimmermann in 1917.

References

neoguineensis
Beetles described in 1917